The LXXX Army Corps was an army corps of the German Wehrmacht during World War II.

Operational history 
The LXXX Army Corps was created on 27 May 1942 in the Poitiers sector in the west of occupied France. Its staff was formed from the Höheres Kommando z. b. V. XXXI and the corps was initially subordinate to the 1st Army under Army Group D. The initial commander of the corps was Curt Gallenkamp, who had already led the Höheres Kommando since 1940. Initially, the corps consisted of four infantry divisions (15th, 327th, 708th, 715th) and the 7th Panzer Division.

From its headquarters in Poitiers, the LXXX Army Corps defended a coastal sector of the Bay of Biscay around La Rochelle. For example, the LXXX Army Corps commanded the 158th Infantry Division at Fontenay-le-Comte and the 708th Infantry Division at Royan on 24 April 1943.

The corps remained on defensive duty in France until the Normandy landings of 6 June 1944. When the Allied forces invaded France, the LXXX Army Corps consisted of the 158th and 708th Infantry Divisions. The headquarters of the two divisions were, just like on 24 April 1943, still at Fontenay-le-Comte and Royan, respectively.

Gallenkamp was relieved of command on 7 August 1944. Franz Beyer assumed command of the corps on 10 August 1944.

By 15 September 1944, the German forces in the west had been pushed back all the way to Germany. The LXXX Army Corps took a position north of the Moselle river, flanked by the I SS Panzer Corps to the north and the LXXXII Army Corps to the south. This remained largely unchanged until mid December, as the Allied forces did not make significant progress in the Ardennes region between September and December 1944. The LXXX Army Corps was transferred from the 1st Army, under which it had served since its inception in May 1942, to the 7th Army in October 1944.

Starting on 16 December 1944, the German Ardennes Offensive began just north of the positions of the LXXX Army Corps. While the I SS Panzer Corps, LXXXV Army Corps, XLVII Panzer Corps, LXVI Army Corps and LVIII Panzer Corps all made significant territorial gains during the Battle of the Bulge, the LXXX Army Corps did not greatly shift its position, merely advancing from the Sauer to the Alzette. It stood opposite to the XII U.S. Corps. Most of the German gains further northwest were undone by the Allied counterattack by 17 January 1945, and the situation in the sector of the LXXX Army Corps had been largely unchanged.

In April 1945, as the German armed forces were disintegrating, the LXXX Army Corps was transferred a final time and became part of the 19th Army.

Organizational structure

Noteworthy individuals 

 Curt Gallenkamp, corps commander of LXXX Army Corps (27 March 1942 – 7 August 1944).
 Franz Beyer, corps commander of LXXX Army Corps (10 August 1944 – 8 May 1945).

References 

Corps of Germany in World War II
Military units and formations established in 1942
Military units and formations disestablished in 1945